José Raymundo Vantolrá Rangel (born 30 March 1943) is a Mexican former footballer, who played for the Mexico national team as a defender.

Career
Vantolrá played club football for Deportivo Toluca F.C.

He was part of the Mexico squad for the 1970 World Cup where he played in four matches. He is the son of the Spanish footballer Martí Vantolrá.

References

External links
FIFA Record

1943 births
Living people
Footballers from Mexico City
Association football defenders
Mexico international footballers
1970 FIFA World Cup players
Mexican football managers
Deportivo Toluca F.C. players
Deportivo Toluca F.C. managers
Santos Laguna managers
Mexican footballers
Liga MX players
Mexican people of Catalan descent